Islwyn Morris (26 August 1920 – 26 April 2011) was a Welsh-speaking actor and director, best known for his roles in Welsh-language television, such as those of David Tushingham in Pobol y Cwm and Idris Vaughan in Glas y Dorlan.

Career
Islwyn Morris was born in Swansea on 26 August 1920. He began his acting career in repertory theatre in Swansea, appearing with Maudie Edwards, among others.

During the Second World War, he served with the South Wales Borderers.

His most notable television roles include Dad in Satellite City (1995–1999), David Tushingham in Pobol y Cwm, and Inspector Idris Vaughan in the 1970s sitcom Glas y Dorlan. He also appeared extensively on English-language television, in series such as Z-Cars, The District Nurse and High Hopes. His radio roles include the BBC Radio Wales soap opera Station Road, and Mr Pritchard in the 2003 BBC production of Under Milk Wood.

He died aged 90, on 26 April 2011. BBC Wales director Keith Jones described him as one of Wales' most loved actors.

References

External links

1920 births
2011 deaths
British Army personnel of World War II
Male actors from Swansea
South Wales Borderers soldiers
Welsh male radio actors
Welsh male television actors
Welsh-speaking actors
20th-century Welsh male actors
21st-century Welsh male actors